Landscape with Tobias and the Angel is a large Baroque landscape painting by the Southern Italian painter Salvator Rosa. It includes a Christian theme from the Book of Tobit: Tobias and the archangel Raphael with the fish from the river Tigris. The painting is on display in the Musée des Beaux-Arts of Strasbourg, France. Its inventory number is 182.

Landscape with Tobias and the Angel was painted in Rome, after the artist's 1662 journey to Venice. It was the first of a series of increasingly small and austere depictions of the subject. The large Strasbourg painting (of which three replicas exist, one of which is kept in the National Gallery, and another in the Wadsworth Atheneum) has been much praised for its expressiveness and its virtuosity since the 18th century.

The depicted landscape is imaginary but probably inspired by the Phlegraean Fields of Rosa's Neapolitan home province, although some art historians have interpreted it as the Tiber Valley near Monte Soratte.

References

External links

Paysage avec Tobie et l’Ange, presentation on the museum's website
Une visite, un thème - Peinture du XVIIème siècle - 5 genres, p. 1. Different presentation on the museum's website.

Paintings in the collection of the Musée des Beaux-Arts de Strasbourg
Landscape paintings
Paintings by Salvator Rosa
1670s paintings
Baroque paintings
Paintings of Raphael (archangel)
Oil on canvas paintings